Antabamba Province is one of the seven provinces of the Apurímac Region in Peru. The capital of the province is the city of Antabamba.

Boundaries
North: Grau Province
East: Cotabambas Province, Cusco Region
South: Arequipa Region
West: Aymaraes Province

Geography 
The Wansu mountain range traverses the province. Some of the highest peaks of the province are listed below:

Districts
The province is divided into seven districts:
 Antabamba
 El Oro
 Huaquirca
 Juan Espinoza Medrano
 Oropesa
 Pachaconas
 Sabaino

Ethnic groups 
The people in the province are mainly indigenous citizens of Quechua descent. Quechua is the language which the majority of the population (77.12%) learnt to speak in childhood, 22.26% of the residents started speaking using the Spanish language and  0.28% using Aymara  (2007 Peru Census).

Sources

External links
Official Website Municipalidad Antabamba

Antabamba Province